Thorpe St. Andrew School is an 11 to 18 mixed secondary school in Thorpe St. Andrew on the outskirts of the city of Norwich in the English county of Norfolk.

Description
In the 2014 inspection, Ofsted described the school: 
The school is larger than the average secondary school and serves the eastern side of Norwich and the adjacent rural communities.
The school operates on a splitsite and is housed mainly in post-war buildings which have been refurbished. There are a number of recently constructed buildings for performing arts, business and technology.The school has extensive grounds and playing fields. 
Most pupils are from White British backgrounds, with a very small number from minority ethnic backgrounds. 
A below-average proportion of students are supported by the pupil premium, which provides additional funding for students who are in local authority care, from armed services families or known to be eligible for free school meals.
The proportions of disabled students and those who have special educational needs supported through school action is broadly average. The proportion supported at school action plus or with a statement of special educational needs is well below average. 
The school meets the government’s current floor standards, which set the minimum expectations for students’ attainment and progress.
A small number of Key Stage 4 students take work-related courses at the City College and other training providers. 
The school has a large sixth form which increasingly recruits a growing number of students from other schools.

Results
In 2008 OFSTED reported that Year 11 pupils were at a higher level than expected. They also said that the pupils were welcoming and polite.

In early 2012 Thorpe St Andrew scored well in the Department for Education school league tables. For 2011, 69% of students achieved 5 or more A*-C grades at GCSE (or equivalent) including English and Mathematics, slightly lower than in 2010 (71%) but higher than both 2009 (67%) and 2008 (64%). The percentage of students who achieved 5 or more A*-C grades at GCSE (or equivalent) was 91% and the number of pupils achieving at least one qualification was 99%. 

In the 2014 inspection, Ofsted described the school as outstanding. In the 2022 Ofsted inspection, the rating dropped to requires improvement. The Sixth Form was described as good.

Notable former pupils
Ben Bradshaw,  politician
Sam Clemmett, actor
Jacyn Heavens, CEO and founder of Epos Now
Neil Innes, writer, comedian and musician
Olly Stone, cricketer

References

External links
 Official Website
 Prospectus
 Thorpe Grammar School Association

Secondary schools in Norfolk
Schools in Norwich